Lodhran–Khanewal Chord Line is the part of Main Line 1, operated and maintained by Pakistan Railways. The line begins from Lodhran Junction station and ends at Khanewal Junction station. There are 9 railway stations from Lodhran Junction to Khanewal Junction. The line is often referred to as the chord line, as it allows trains which traveling on the Karachi–Peshawar Railway Line to bypass Multan.

Stations
 Lodhran Junction
 Shahidanwala
 Rukanpur
 Dunyapur
 Kutabpur
 Jahania
 Jangal Mariala
 Mehar Shah
 Khanewal Junction

See also
Karachi–Peshawar Railway Line
Railway Lines in Pakistan

References

Railway stations on Lodhran–Khanewal Branch Line
5 ft 6 in gauge railways in Pakistan